Dermie F. O'Connell (April 13, 1928 – October 5, 1988) was an American professional basketball player.

A 6'0" guard from the College of the Holy Cross, O'Connell played two seasons (1948–1950) in the National Basketball Association as a member of the Boston Celtics and St. Louis Bombers. He averaged 5.8 points per game in his NBA career.

BAA/NBA career statistics

Regular season

Notes

1928 births
1988 deaths
American men's basketball players
Basketball players from New York (state)
Boston Celtics players
Holy Cross Crusaders men's basketball players
St. Louis Bombers (NBA) players
Utica Pros players
Guards (basketball)